Eric Shogren (born January 16, 1966) is a Russian-American businessman, the founder of New York Pizza and Kuzina chains.

Early life and career
Eric Shogren was born on 16 January 1966. His grandfather, an immigrant from Odessa, created a fruit market in the center of Minneapolis, and Eric traded fruit with him from early childhood. There were boxes of bananas in his room; in the future, a banana will be present in almost all products of the Kuzina chain (cakes and donuts with banana cream, banana bread and muffins).

He was educated at the Blake School in Minneapolis.

In 1992, Eric Shogren arrived in Novosibirsk to his brother Brad, who studied here in one of the educational institutions of this city.

In Novosibirsk, he bought a hockey puck at a local store and was surprised by its cheapness. He decided to sell hockey pucks from Russia to USA, but this business failed.

His brother Brad introduced Eric Shogren to a Novosibirsk businessman, Eric created a business with this person, they started exporting cars from America to Russia. In 1993, he earned money and opened the first supermarket in Novosibirsk. The new store sold products of the SuperValu and enjoyed great popularity among the residents of the city. But It stopped working.

New York Pizza

After the closure of the Novosibirsk supermarket, Eric Shogren returned to USA, where he met his future wife, Olga, she came from Novosibirsk to America to get an education. They got married and in 1995 moved to Novosibirsk, where in 1996 founded The New York Pizza company. Then the New York Pizza opened in other Russian cities.

After the founding of New York Pizza, Eric Shogren continued to create other restaurants in Novosibirsk: New York Coffee, New York Diner and New York Times grill-bar, where rock-n-roll and blues musicians performed.

Klassika Restaurant
In 2000, Eric Shogren and a banker Igor Kim opened the Klassika Restaurant in Novosibirsk, the idea of its creation belonged to the Novosibirsk restaurateur Denis Ivanov (at that time, he was the director of the New York Pizza holding). Half of the restaurant belonged to Kim, the other half was owned by Shogren. In 2003, Eric Shogren sold his share of the restaurant to Igor Kim.

Siberian Farmer
In 2004, Shogren created the Siberian Farmer project. In 2005, his new company leased an area of 21 hectares in the Kochenyovsky District (Novosibirsk Oblast). He also planned to rent 900 hectares for 49 years for forage crops breeding. But this project failed.

Financial difficulties and criminal prosecution
In 2008, Novosibirsk workers of NYP held rallies to protest against delay wage. In February 2009, the company employees also organized a picket in the city, Eric Shogren arrived at the picketers. He said that the company wants to return money to people and that debts are gradually being paid to many former employees.

In April 2009, Shogren and the company's top manager Evgenia Golovkova were detained, but they were released on bail after 48 hours.

In August 2009, Eric Shogren organized a press conference, he told reporters that bankruptcy trustee Vladimir Klopov attempted to raider the NYP pizzeria located in Akademgorodok on Morskoy Prospect. Shogren also expressed the opinion that because of the raider seizure, the company lost one NYP in Pervomaysky Square of Novosibirsk and one pizzeria in Barnaul.

In 2010, a criminal case was opened against Eric Shogren and Evgenia Golovkova. They were accused of fraud. The prosecution stated that Shogren and Golovkova in 2006 persuaded their employee, Anna Sidevich, to issue a loan of one million rubles in the Bank of Moscow, promising to return her money.

In 2014, the Zheleznodorozhny District Court of Novosibirsk dismissed the criminal case against Eric Shogren and Evgenia Golovkova. The state prosecution asked to appoint Shogren and Golovkova five and a half years of probation, after which it immediately expressed a request for their release "due to the expiration of the statute of limitations". Businessmen do not admit their guilt.

Business after criminal prosecution
Despite the fact that many NYP establishments were closed, Eric Shogren kept his business. In 2015, Kuzina and New York Pizza chains was opened in Moscow. In 2016, Eric Shogren bought Baker's Wife Confectionery in Minneapolis. In 2017, the building of the former Baker's Wife was occupied by Kuzina.

References

External links
 Siberian pizza chain shows way to Russia. Reuters.
 Die Zeit. Pizza für Sibirien.
 Тайна Эрика Шогрена. Сиб.фм
 «В России всё меняется быстрее — это поразительно». НГС.НОВОСТИ.

1966 births
Shogren
Living people
Russian businesspeople in the United States
Businesspeople from Novosibirsk